Eystrup is a railway station located in Eystrup, Germany. The station is located on the Bremen–Hanover railway. The train services are operated by Deutsche Bahn.

Train services
The following services currently call at the station:

Regional services  Norddeich - Emden - Oldenburg - Bremen - Nienburg - Hanover
Regional services  Bremerhaven-Lehe - Bremen - Nienburg - Hanover

References

Railway stations in Lower Saxony